= Baghwala Mohra =

- Town
- Location within Pakistan
- Coordinates: 33.25°N 73.20°E
- Country: Pakistan
- Province: Islamabad C.T
- Elevation: 536 m (1,759 ft)
- Time zone: UTC+5 (PST)

Baghwala Mohra is a town in the Islamabad Capital Territory of Pakistan. It is located at 33° 25' 25N 73° 20' 25E with an altitude of 536 metres (1761 feet).
